Kirants may refer to:

 Kiranti people, or Kirants, an ethnic group of India and Nepal
 Kirants, Armenia, a village in Armenia